The Ignaz Lieben Prize, named after the Austrian banker , is an annual Austrian award made by the Austrian Academy of Sciences to young scientists working in the fields of molecular biology, chemistry, or physics.

Biography
The Ignaz Lieben Prize has been called the Austrian Nobel Prize. It is similar in intent but somewhat older than the Nobel Prize. The Austrian merchant Ignaz L. Lieben, whose family supported many philanthropic activities, had stipulated in his testament that 6,000 florins should be used “for the common good”. In 1863 this money was given to the Austrian Imperial Academy of Sciences, and the Ignaz L. Lieben Prize was instituted. Every three years, the sum of 900 florins was to be given to an Austrian scientist in the field of chemistry, physics, or physiology.  This sum corresponded to roughly 40 per cent of the annual income of a university professor.

From 1900 on, the prize was offered on a yearly basis. The endowment was twice increased by the Lieben family. When the endowment had lost its value due to inflation after World War I, the family transferred the necessary sum yearly to the Austrian Academy of Sciences. But since the family was persecuted by the National Socialists, the prize was discontinued after the German Anschluss of Austria in 1938.

Richard Lieben (1842–1919), the younger son of Ignaz Lieben, financed the Richard Lieben Prize in Mathematics, which was awarded every three years from 1912 to 1921, and one final time in 1928, before being discontinued.

In 2004 the Lieben prize was reinstated, with support from Isabel Bader and Alfred Bader (who was able to flee from Austria to Great Britain at the age of fourteen in 1938). Now, the award amounts to US Dollar 36,000, and it is offered yearly to young scientists who work in Austria, Bosnia-Herzegovina, Croatia, the Czech Republic, Hungary, Slovakia or Slovenia (i.e., in one of the countries that were part of the Austro-Hungarian Empire a hundred years ago), and who work in the fields of molecular biology, chemistry, or physics.

Laureates 
Source (1865–1937; 2004–2007): Ignaz Lieben Gesellschaft:

2021 
2020 Norbert Werner
2019 Gašper Tkačik
2018 Nuno Maulide 
2017 Iva Tolić
2016 Illés Farkas
2015 Francesca Ferlaino
2014 
2013 Barbara Kraus
2012 
2011 Mihály Kovács
2010 Robert Kralovics
2009 Frank Verstraete
2008 Csaba Pal
2007 Markus Aspelmeyer  
2006 Andrius Baltuska
2005 Ronald Micura
2004 Zoltan Nusser
 Not awarded 1938–2003
1937 Marietta Blau and Hertha Wambacher
1936 Franz Lippay and Richard Rössler 
1935 Armin Dadieu
1934 Eduard Haschek 
1933 Ferdinand Scheminzky
1932 Georg Koller
1931 Karl Höfler
1930 Wolf Johannes Müller
1929 Karl Przibram
1927 Otto Porsch and Gustav Klein
1926 Adolf Franke
1925 Lise Meitner
1924 Otto Loewi and Ernst Peter Pick
1923 Otto von Fürth
1922 Karl Wilhelm Friedrich Kohlrausch
1921 Karl von Frisch
1920 Ernst Späth 
1919 Victor Franz Hess
1918 Eugen Steinach
1917 Wilhelm Schlenk
1916 Friedrich Adolf Paneth
1915 Wilhelm Trendelenburg
1914 Fritz Pregl
1913 Stefan Meyer
1912 Oswald Richter
1911 Friedrich Emich
1910 Felix Ehrenhaft
1909 Eugen Steinach
1908 Paul Friedlaender
1907 Hans Benndorf
1906 Arnold Durig
1905 Rudolf Wegscheider and Hans Leopold Meyer 
1904 Franz Schwab
1903 Josef Schaffer
1902 Josef Herzig
1901 Josef Liznar
1900 Theodor Beer and Oskar Zoth
1898 Konrad Natterer
1895 Josef Maria Eder and Eduard Valenta
1892 Guido Goldschmiedt
1889 Sigmund Ritter Exner von Ewarten
1886 Zdenko Hans Skraup
1883 Victor Ritter Ebner von Rofenstein
1880 Hugo Weidel
1877 Sigmund Ritter Exner von Ewarten 
1874 Eduard Linnemann
1871 Leander Ditscheiner 
1868 Eduard Linnemann and Karl von Than
1865 Josef Stefan

Richard Lieben Prize
 1912 Josip Plemelj
 1915 Gustav Herglotz 
 1918 Wilhelm Gross
 1921 Hans Hahn and Johann Radon
 1928 Karl Menger

See also

 List of biology awards
 List of chemistry awards
 List of physics awards

References

Austrian science and technology awards
Biology awards
Chemistry awards
Physics awards
1863 establishments in the Austrian Empire
Awards established in 1863